Oğulcan Çağlayan (born 22 March 1996) is a Turkish footballer who plays as a forward for Pendikspor on loan from Galatasaray. He made his Süper Lig debut on 14 February 2014.

Club career

Gaziantepspor
Oğulcan Çağlayan played 15 games with Gaziantepspor since 2013 and scored 2 goals. Oğulcan scored his first league goal by a bicycle kick on 4 October 2014 against Kasımpaşa. However, Gaziantepspor lost the game 4–2.

Kayseri Erciyesspor
On 2 February 2015, Oğulcan had been transferred to Kayseri Erciyesspor. Oğulcan Çağlayan had played 11 games in the second half of the Süper Lig: 2014–15 Süper Lig and was able to score 3 goals. His first goal was against Sivasspor in the 15th minute. Oğulcan received a pass from Ethem Pülgir and was able to pass the two defenders to finish the play with a goal. However this wasn’t enough for Erciyesspor to win the game and lost 3-2 to Sivasspor. On 8 May 2015, Björn Vleminckx drops the ball inside the box with a header and Oğulcan Çağlayan rushes inside the box to score with a wonder volley kick to score against Mersin İdman Yurdu in the 43rd minute. The game was drawn 2-2 at the full time. On 23 May 2015, Kasımpaşa goalkeeper Ertaç Özbir made a huge mistake by trying to kick the ball from his goal end but the ball ended up in the foot of Oğulcan and he was able to control the ball very smoothly and cracked two players to score the third goal for Erciyesspor. However, this wasn’t enough for the win and game ended up 3-3 fulltime.

Galatasaray
On 11 August 2020, he signed a 4-year contract with Galatasaray. The contract is set to expire on May 31st, 2024. Galatasaray scored his first goal on the road against Trabzonspor on 26 December 2020.

Eyüpspor
On 8 February 2022, Çağlayan was loaned to TFF First League club Eyüpspor for the rest of the season.

Giresunspor (loan)
On 8 September 2022, he signed a 1-year loan contract with Süper Lig team Giresunspor.

In the statement made by Oğulcan club Galatasaray on 16 January 2023, it was stated that the rental contract with Giresunspor has been mutually terminated.

Pendikspor (loan)
On 16 January 2023, he signed a 6-month temporary contract with Pendikspor.

Career statistics

Club

References

External links
 
 
 
 
 

1996 births
Living people
People from Altındağ, Ankara
Footballers from Ankara
Turkish footballers
Turkey youth international footballers
Gaziantepspor footballers
Çaykur Rizespor footballers
Association football forwards
Galatasaray S.K. footballers
Eyüpspor footballers
Giresunspor footballers
Pendikspor footballers
Süper Lig players
TFF First League players